Boggy Creek (also known as Boggy Creek: The Legend Is True) is a 2011 American horror film directed by Brian T. Jaynes, written by Jennifer Minar-Jaynes, and starring Texas Battle, Stephanie Honoré, Damon Lipari, Shavon Kirksey, and Melissa Carnell as college students attacked by legendary creatures that resemble Bigfoot.  Despite its name, it is unrelated to The Legend of Boggy Creek or its two sequels.

Plot 

Jennifer takes several of her friends to a remote cabin in Texas, where her father died. There, locals warn them of hostile creatures that, according to legend, murder the men and abduct the women. The creatures, which resemble the legendary Bigfoot, eventually show up and attack Jennifer and her friends.

Cast

Production 
Shooting took place in Jefferson and Uncertain, Texas. The film was part of a dispute over funding between the director and an early investor. The matter was eventually taken to court.

Release 
Boggy Creek premiered at the sixth Texas Frightmare Weekend in April 2011. It was released on DVD and Blu-ray on September 13, 2011.

Reception 

Scott Foy of Dread Central rated it 1/5 stars, and wrote, "Boggy Creek doesn't work as drama, doesn't deliver as horror, and is no fun at all to watch."  Paul Doro of Shock Till You Drop called it "low-rent amateur hour all around".

Novelization 
A novelization of the film entitled: Boggy Creek: The Legend is True was released in 2012.

References

External links 
 
 
 

2011 films
2011 horror films
American monster movies
American independent films
Bigfoot films
Films set in Texas
Films shot in Texas
2010s English-language films
2010s American films